Alcathoe is a genus of moths in the family Sesiidae.

Species
Alcathoe autumnalis  Engelhardt, 1946
Alcathoe carolinensis  Engelhardt, 1925
Alcathoe caudata (Harris, 1839)
Alcathoe pepsioides  Engelhardt, 1925
Alcathoe verrugo (Druce, 1884)
Alcathoe altera  Zukowsky, 1936
Alcathoe cuauhtemoci  Krogmann & Riefenstahl, 2004
Alcathoe helena (Druce, 1889)
Alcathoe korites (Druce, 1884)
Alcathoe leucopyga  Bryk, 1953
Alcathoe melini  Bryk, 1953

References

Sesiidae